Richard D. Hansen is an American archaeologist who is an adjunct professor of anthropology at the University of Utah.

Career
Hansen is a specialist on the ancient Maya civilization and directs the Mirador Basin Project, which investigates a circumscribed geological and cultural area known as the Mirador Basin in the northern Petén, Guatemala. He has previously held positions at the University of California, Los Angeles and Idaho State University.  He is also the founder and president of the Foundation for Anthropological Research and Environmental Studies (FARES). His work has been featured in 36 film documentaries and was the principal consultant for the movie Apocalypto (Mel Gibson) (Hansen 2012a), CBS Survivor Guatemala, and National Geographic's The Story of God with Morgan Freeman.

He was also awarded the Orden de la Monja Blanca by the Guatemalan Ministry of Defense in 2019.  He was named as "one of the 24 individuals that changed Latin America" and his work has been an important contribution to the understanding of the development of Maya civilization.

References

External links
Article by Richard Hansen & Mel Gibson about the 2006 film Apocalypto.

Mirador Basin Project, directed by Hansen
Foundation for Anthropological Research and Environmental Studies (FARES), established by Hansen
Asociacion de Amigos del Patrimonio Natural y Cultural de Guatemala (APANAC)

Living people
Mayanists
American Mesoamericanists
American archaeologists
Mesoamerican archaeologists
20th-century Mesoamericanists
21st-century Mesoamericanists
Year of birth missing (living people)
Idaho State University faculty
University of California, Los Angeles alumni
University of Utah faculty
Collapse